James Thorn (1 June 1882 – 21 November 1956) was a New Zealand politician and trade unionist. He was an organiser and candidate for the Independent Political Labour League, Social Democratic Party then the Labour Party.

Biography

Early life
Thorn was born in Christchurch, educated at Christchurch Boys' High School. He worked in the Addington Railway Workshops and as a journalist. Thorn was a bugler in the third New Zealand Contingent to the Boer War in 1900 and 1901; the experience turned him into a pacifist. He was engaged in trade union and party activity, including 1909 to 1913 in England and Scotland.

In 1907 and 1908, he was President of the Independent Political Labour League. In 1909, he went to England and then Scotland and worked for labour parties there.

Political career

He met his future wife while living in Palmerston North; Margaret Anderson (1897–1969), 15 years his junior, who had joined the Social Democratic Party with her father. The Thorns married on 8 December 1917 in Wellington. He was imprisoned for opposing conscription in World War I.

He was president of the Labour Party (1929–1931), and vice-president at various times (1925–1927; 1928–1929; 1936–1938), and national secretary (1932–1936).

He represented the electorate of Thames from 1935 to 1946, when the seat was abolished. From 1943 to 1946 Thorn was Under-Secretary to the Prime Minister.

Later life and death
From 1947 to 1950 he was High Commissioner to Canada, and was President of UNESCO in 1949. In 1952 he wrote a biography of Peter Fraser and later published a history of the First Labour Government. In 1953, he was awarded the Queen Elizabeth II Coronation Medal.

Thorn died in 1956 and his ashes were buried at Karori Cemetery, Wellington.

Notes

References

External links
Biography and photo at Union website

|-

|-

1882 births
1956 deaths
People from Christchurch
New Zealand Labour Party MPs
Members of the New Zealand House of Representatives
New Zealand MPs for North Island electorates
New Zealand military personnel of the Second Boer War
New Zealand Presbyterians
New Zealand pacifists
UNESCO officials
People educated at Christchurch Boys' High School
High Commissioners of New Zealand to Canada
Unsuccessful candidates in the 1946 New Zealand general election
Unsuccessful candidates in the 1905 New Zealand general election
Unsuccessful candidates in the 1908 New Zealand general election
Unsuccessful candidates in the 1914 New Zealand general election
Unsuccessful candidates in the 1931 New Zealand general election
Independent Political Labour League politicians
Social Democratic Party (New Zealand) politicians
New Zealand conscientious objectors
Burials at Karori Cemetery
New Zealand anti–World War I activists
New Zealand officials of the United Nations
20th-century New Zealand journalists